The 2021 season was Negeri Sembilan's 98th year in their history and 9th season in Malaysia Premier League since it was first introduced in 2004. Also it was the third season in the Malaysia Premier League since 2019 following relegation 2018 season. Along with the league, the club will also compete in the Malaysia Cup.

Events
On 26 December 2020, the club signed several new players. Among them were Raja Imran Shah Raja Amin, Barathkumar Ramaloo, Aroon Kumar, Damien Lim, Saiful Ridzuwan Selamat, Annas Rahmat and Ferris Danial. The club also signed, Tasnim Fitri and Osman Yusoff.

On 17 March 2021, the club won over Perak II in a league match.

On 25 April 2021, the club draw 1-1 against Sarawak United in a league match.

On 30 June 2021, two foreign players, Fernando Barbosa and Rafinha has been replaced with Francis Koné and Arthur Cunha during mid season transfer.

Players

Current squad

Transfers

In

Out

Competitions

Malaysia Premier League

League table

Results by round

Matches

Malaysia Cup

Group stage

The draw for the group stage was held on 15 September 2021.

Statistics

Appearances and goals

|-
! colspan="16" style="background:#dcdcdc; text-align:center"| Players transferred out during the season
|-

|}

Clean sheets

References

Negeri Sembilan FA seasons
Negeri Sembilan